Wolfgang Baumgratz (born 10 October 1948) is a German organist and academic teacher. He is the organist of the Bremer Dom, and professor of organ at the Hochschule für Künste Bremen. He has toured in Europe as a concert organist and made recordings. He was president of the international association Gesellschaft der Orgelfreunde from 1998 to 2013.

Life 
Born in Meersburg, Baumgratz received his musical training in Heidelberg and Freiburg im Breisgau, where he studied with Ludwig Doerr. He passed the A-examination in Protestant church music in 1976 and worked as cantor at the Johanneskirche in Merzhausen from 1971 to 1976. He completed two years of organ studies on a scholarship from the Deutscher Akademischer Austauschdienst (DAAD), studying in Amsterdam with Albert de Klerk. In 1978, he completed the soloist's examination in organ.

In 1979, Baumgratz was appointed as successor of Zsigmond Szathmáry as organist at the Bremer Dom. One year later he received an organ teacher position at the Hochschule für Künste Bremen (HfK Bremen), and in 1984, he was appointed professor of organ there. Five years later he was appointed head of the HfK Bremen church music department.

Since 1982, he has been the organ expert of the Bremen Protestant Church. In 1990, he became Vice President of the international  e. V. (GdO). He was the association's president from 1998 to 2013. When he retired in 2014, Baumgratz took over an organist position at the Protestant St. Remberti congregation in Bremen (in addition to being a full-time church musician), whose Fischer+Krämer organ (1993/94) he had helped design.

His concert tours as an organist have taken him through many European countries, and he has made numerous recordings.

Recordings 
 Werke für Orgel und Violine, Gitarre, Flöte, Englischhorn by Claus Kühnl u. a. 
 Werke von Bach und Händel in romantischen Orgelbearbeitungen (Die Sauer-Orgel im Bremer Dom)
 Orgellandschaft Schleswig/Sonderjylland
 Romantische Orgeln in Holstein 
 Schnitger-Orgel Grasberg, works by Johann Caspar Ferdinand Fischer
 Das Orgelwerk von Wilhelm Friedemann Bach 
 Orgellandschaft Holstein/Lübeck 
 Orgelmusik von Komponistinnen (Sauer organ at the Bremer Dom, works by Schumann, Andree and Chaminade)
 Orgelwerke von Georg Philipp Telemann 
 Orgelmusik der Bachfamilie 
 Silbermann Orgel Vol. 6, works by Schneider, Bestel and Homilius 
 Joseph Rheinberger Orgelwerke, Vol. 7, Sauer organ at the Bremer Domn 
 Inventionen & Sinfonien von Johann Sebastian Bach 
 J. S. Bach, 6 Triosonaten
 Orgelmusik von Albert De Klerk
 Orgelkonzert im Dom zu Bremen – Kompositionen über das Te Deum

References

External links 
 
 

German classical organists
German music educators
1948 births
Living people
Musicians from Baden-Württemberg